Makedonsko Sonce is a monthly magazine published in North Macedonia. The title means "Macedonian Sun", referring to the Vergina Sun, which is used in the logo of the magazine. It was established by Gjorgija (George) Atanasoski and the first edition was published on June 24, 1994. In the first two decades, the magazine had weekly editions, but in the last few years it is published once a month. It describes its own political stance as affirming "Macedonian national values, not only on territory of Macedonia but also in the other parts of ethnic Macedonia".

References

Magazines published in North Macedonia
Macedonian-language magazines
Magazines established in 1994
Mass media in Skopje
Monthly magazines
Propaganda in North Macedonia